Carskadon is a surname. Notable people with the surname include: 

Mary Carskadon, American sleep researcher
Thomas Carskadon (1837–1905), American politician